Lagis is a genus of annelids belonging to the family Pectinariidae.

The genus has almost cosmopolitan distribution.

Species:

Lagis abranchiata 
Lagis australis 
Lagis bocki 
Lagis crenulatus 
Lagis hupferi 
Lagis koreni 
Lagis neapolitana 
Lagis plurihamus 
Lagis portus 
Lagis pseudokoreni 
Lagis tenera

References

Terebellida
Annelid genera